The Stone Harbor School District is a community public school district that serves students in kindergarten through eighth grade from Stone Harbor, in Cape May County, New Jersey, United States.

As of the 2018–19 school year, the district, comprising one school, had an enrollment of 99 students and 11.0 classroom teachers (on an FTE basis), for a student–teacher ratio of 9.0:1. In the 2016–17 school year, Stone Harbor had the 4th-smallest enrollment of any school district in the state, with 75 students.

Starting with the 2011-12 school year, in an agreement with the Avalon School District, public school students in grades K-4 from both communities attend school in Stone Harbor while all students in grades 5-8 attend school in Avalon.

Students in public school for ninth through twelfth grades attend Middle Township High School in Cape May Court House, as part of a sending/receiving relationship with the Middle Township Public Schools, together with students from Avalon, Dennis Township and Woodbine. As of the 2018–19 school year, the high school had an enrollment of 767 students and 64.6 classroom teachers (on an FTE basis), for a student–teacher ratio of 11.9:1.

The district is classified by the New Jersey Department of Education as being in District Factor Group "FG", the fourth-highest of eight groupings. District Factor Groups organize districts statewide to allow comparison by common socioeconomic characteristics of the local districts. From lowest socioeconomic status to highest, the categories are A, B, CD, DE, FG, GH, I and J.

Operations
The Avalon and Stone Harbor school districts operate like a single school district even though they are legally two separate districts; they can move teachers between the two schools. In terms of their student populations both districts having among the lowest numbers in New Jersey. As of 2013 both school districts have a single school bus. The property tax rates are 5 cents per $100 of assessed value, relatively low in the state, as the two districts have ample taxable territory of summer houses.

Curriculum
The student sharing agreement means the Avalon and Stone Harbor districts retain foreign language and extracurricular programs they would not otherwise have.

School
Stone Harbor School had a student body of 99 students in the 2018–19 school year.

In 2016 the school had 70 students. About 40% of the combined Avalon and Stone Harbor students were from out of district and paid tuition, with many coming from the Cape May Courthouse area.

Administration
Core members of the district's administration are:
Stacey LaRocca Tracy, Superintendent
Linda Fiori, Business Administrator / Board Secretary

Board of education
The district's board of education, with five members, sets policy and oversees the fiscal and educational operation of the district through its administration. As a Type II school district, the board's trustees are elected directly by voters to serve three-year terms of office on a staggered basis, with one or two seats up for election each year held (since 2012) as part of the November general election. The board appoints a superintendent to oversee the day-to-day operation of the district. An additional representative is appointed by the Avalon district to represent its interests on the Stone Harbor board.

References

External links

Stone Harbor School - Joint website of Stone Harbor and Avalon schools

 
Stone Harbor School District, National Center for Education Statistics

Stone Harbor, New Jersey
New Jersey District Factor Group FG
School districts in Cape May County, New Jersey
Public elementary schools in New Jersey
Public K–8 schools in New Jersey
Schools in Cape May County, New Jersey